Gerson Echeverry (born August 25, 1971) is an American retired soccer forward who played professionally in Major League Soccer, USISL and the National Professional Soccer League.

Player

Youth
Echeverry was born in Paterson, New Jersey.  In 1990, he graduated from John F. Kennedy High School where he had scored 55 goals during his high school soccer career. He played college soccer at Seton Hall University from 1990 to 1993.  He was a 1991 Third Team All American.

Professional
In December 1993, the Buffalo Blizzard selected Echeverry in the fourth round of the National Professional Soccer League draft.  He did not sign with the team.  In 1995, he played for the Richmond Kickers of the USISL.  He then played for Cortuluá in Colombia.  On February 2, 1997, D.C. United selected Echevvery in second round (fourteenth overall) of the 1997 MLS Supplemental Draft.  United waived him on March 28, 1997, during the pre-season.  On April 3, 1997, the MetroStars claimed Echeverry off waivers.  He played one game with the MetroStars as well as a handful on loan to the South Jersey Barons.  The MetroStars released him on June 4, 1997.  Less than two weeks later, he signed with the Richmond Kickers.  In 1998, he began the season with the Hershey Wildcats but was released in June.  In August, he signed with the Central Jersey Riptide for the remainder of the season.  In 1999, he finished his outdoor career with the Maryland Mania.  In 1998, Echeverry moved indoors with the Harrisburg Heat of the National Professional Soccer League where he played two seasons.

Coach
In July 2004, Echevery became an assistant coach with the Seton Hall Pirates soccer team. In February 2012, he was named the new head coach. In 2018 he was named head coach of Rio Grande Valley FC, after 3 years of the clubs lowest records and no success developing players the Houston Dynamo FC did not renew his contract. After his tenor with the Toros he applied to the local college UTRGV for the head coaching position, the university did not consider him. At the beginning of 2021, his good friend and colleague Wilmer Cabrera was named head coach of RGVFC. Wilmer hired Gerson as the club assistant coach.

Coaching statistics

References

External links
 MetroStar profile
 Seton Hall Pirates coaching bio

1971 births
Living people
Sportspeople from Paterson, New Jersey
Central Jersey Riptide players
American soccer players
American expatriate soccer players
Harrisburg Heat players
John F. Kennedy High School (Paterson, New Jersey) alumni
Major League Soccer players
Maryland Mania players
New York Red Bulls players
National Professional Soccer League (1984–2001) players
Ocean City Nor'easters players
Seton Hall Pirates men's soccer coaches
Seton Hall Pirates men's soccer players
USL League Two players
USL Second Division players
A-League (1995–2004) players
D.C. United draft picks
Cortuluá footballers
Expatriate footballers in Colombia
Soccer players from New Jersey
Rio Grande Valley FC Toros coaches
Association football forwards
American soccer coaches